Fannystelle is an unincorporated settlement in southcentral Manitoba, Canada. It is situated on Provincial Trunk Highway 2 approximately 48 kilometers (30 miles) west of Winnipeg in the Rural Municipality of Grey.

References 

Unincorporated communities in Pembina Valley Region